Kristian Feyer Andvord (17 May 185519 May 1934) was a Norwegian physician and medical researcher. He was a pioneer in the study and treatment of tuberculosis.

He was born at Lyngdal in Vest-Agder as a son of parish priest Thorstein Rolfsen Andvord and Sofie Barbara Margrethe Feyer. He was the father of jurist and diplomat Rolf Andvord. He graduated with a degree in medicine in 1882. From 1887 to 1896, he was associated with the Tonsåsen Sanatorium (now Tonsåsen Rehabilitation Centre) at Valdres in Oppland. Andvord conducted a study of the treatment of tuberculosis while at Tonsåsen and published a number of studies starting in 1889. He later moved to Kristiania (now Oslo) and returned to general practition and to work at the  Gausdal Sanatorium.

He was decorated Knight, First Class of the Order of St. Olav in 1925, and Knight of the Swedish Order of the Polar Star.

References

1855 births
1934 deaths
People from Lyngdal
Norwegian pulmonologists
Norwegian medical researchers
Knights of the Order of the Polar Star